Jaago may refer to:

 Jaago (1985 film)
 Jaago (2004 film), a Bollywood crime drama film
 Jaago (2010 film), a Bangladeshi sports drama film
 JAAGO Foundation,  a Bangladesh-based civil society organization
 Jaan Jaago (1887–1949), Estonian wrestler